The 2016 New Orleans Bowl was a post-season American college football bowl game played on December 17, 2016 at Mercedes-Benz Superdome in New Orleans, Louisiana. The 16th annual edition of the New Orleans Bowl was one of the 2016–17 bowl games that conclude the 2016 FBS football season. Sponsored by freight shipping company R+L Carriers, the game was officially known as the R+L Carriers New Orleans Bowl.  Southern Miss won the game by a score of 28–21.

Team selection
The game featured the Southern Miss Golden Eagles against the Louisiana–Lafayette Ragin' Cajuns.

This was the 51st meeting between the schools, with Southern Miss leading the all-time series 38–11–1.  The previous meeting of the two teams was on August 30, 2008, where the Golden Eagles defeated the Ragin' Cajuns by a score of 51–21.

Southern Miss

Louisiana-Lafayette

Game summary

Scoring summary

Source:

Statistics

References

External links
 

2016–17 NCAA football bowl games
2016
2016 New Orleans Bowl
2016 New Orleans Bowl
2016 in sports in Louisiana
December 2016 sports events in the United States